Judge Sparks may refer to:

John E. Sparks (born 1953), judge of the United States Court of Appeals for the Armed Forces
Sam Sparks (born 1939), judge of the Austin Division of the United States District Court for the Western District of Texas
William Morris Sparks (1872–1950), judge of the United States Court of Appeals for the Seventh Circuit